Gesundbrunnen is the name of the following places and facilities in Germany:

 Gesundbrunnen (Berlin), a subdistrict of Bezirk Mitte in Berlin and also there:
 Berlin-Gesundbrunnen station
 Stadion am Gesundbrunnen (demolished in 1974), former home ground of Hertha BSC football club
 Gesundbrunnen (Bautzen), a subdistrict of the Saxon town of Bautzen
 Gesundbrunnen (Halle), a subdistrict of Halle (Saale) in Saxony-Anhalt and the spring of the same name
 Gesundbrunnen (Hofgeismar), a subdistrict of Hofgeismar
 Diesdorfer Gesundbrunnen, a spring in the village of Diesdorf on the city territory of Magdeburg
 The SLK Clinic "am Gesundbrunnen" in Heilbronn 
 Gesundbrunnen (Sagard), spa and bathing institution on the island of Rügen